First-order equational logic consists of quantifier-free terms of ordinary first-order logic, with equality as the only predicate symbol. The model theory of this logic was developed into universal algebra by Birkhoff, Grätzer, and Cohn. It was later made into a branch of category theory by Lawvere ("algebraic theories").
	
The terms of equational logic are built up from variables and constants using function symbols (or operations).

Syllogism

Here are the four inference rules of logic.  denotes textual substitution of expression  for variable  in expression .

History

Equational logic was developed over the years (beginning in the early 1980s) by researchers in the formal development of programs, who felt a need for an effective style of manipulation, of calculation. Involved were people like Roland Carl Backhouse, Edsger W. Dijkstra, Wim H.J. Feijen, David Gries, Carel S. Scholten, and Netty van Gasteren. Wim Feijen is responsible for important details of the proof format.

The axioms are similar to those used by Dijkstra and Scholten in their monograph Predicate calculus and program semantics (Springer Verlag, 1990), but our order of presentation is slightly different.

In their monograph, Dijkstra and Scholten use the three inference rules Leibniz, Substitution, and Transitivity. However, Dijkstra/Scholten system is not a logic, as logicians use the word. Some of their manipulations are based on the meanings of the terms involved, and not on clearly presented syntactical rules of manipulation. The first attempt at making a real logic out of it appeared in A Logical Approach to Discrete Math, however the inference rule Equanimity is missing there, and the definition of theorem is contorted to account for it. The introduction of Equanimity and its use in the proof format is due to Gries and Schneider. It is used, for example, in the proofs of soundness and completeness, and it appears in the second edition of A Logical Approach to Discrete Math.

Proof
The logic symbols  and  indicate "true" and "false," respectively, and  indicates "not." The theorem numbers refer to theorems of A Logical Approach to Discrete Math.

First, lines – show a use of inference rule Leibniz:

is the conclusion of Leibniz, and its premise  is given on line . In the same way, the equality on lines – are substantiated using Leibniz.

The "hint" on line  is supposed to give a premise of Leibniz, showing what substitution of equals for equals is being used. This premise is theorem  with the substitution , i.e.

This shows how inference rule Substitution is used within hints.

This shows how Transitivity is used.

Hence, by inference rule Equanimity, we conclude that line  is also a theorem. And  is what we wanted to prove.

See also 
 Theory of pure equality

References

External links
 Sakharov, Alex. "Equational Logic." From MathWorld--A Wolfram Web Resource, created by Eric W. Weisstein.

Mathematical logic